CTP (Chetyiyarammal thanduparakkal) family were a big family.

History
Kodithodika Family was a prominent landowning Muslim family in the early history of Morayur. lineage of the family goes to descendants of Kunhali Marakkar who were expelled by the British to Ponnani. First man who found the Family tree was settled at Cheruputhoor a place near to Morayur and Mongam with his brother. The family was expanded further to Morayur, Kondotty, Amayoor, Arimbra, kuruppath

At the British Raj rule, it was common practice to appoint 'Adhikaries' from major families with inheritance rights especially land, thus the post was held by the Kodithodika family in Morayur. They continued to hold the post after Independence (1947) up to 1961. The first president of the Gram panchayat was Kodithodika 'Bappu' Ahmed, who served from 1969 to 1995.

References

History of Kerala
Muslim families